We're Not Here to Be Loved is the debut studio album by American rock band Fleshwater. Produced by Converge guitarist Kurt Ballou, the album was released on November 4, 2022 through Closed Casket Activities.

Background
Fleshwater was formed in 2020 by Anthony DiDio, Matt Wood, and Jeremy Martin of Vein.fm along with Marisa Shirar. The band released a demo on February 21, 2020; the demo was re-released later that year on cassette with a cover of "Enjoy" by Björk as a bonus track. The demo became an underground hit on the Internet, with the song "Linda Claire" gaining over 1 million streams on Spotify.

On October 6, 2022, the band released the single "Kiss the Ladder" and announced that their debut studio album would be released on November 4. The band released a second single, "The Razor's Apple," on October 21.

Track listing

Personnel
Fleshwater
Marisa Shirar – lead vocals
Anthony DiDio – guitar, vocals
Jeremy Martin – bass
Matt Wood – drums

Additional
Kurt Ballou – producer, mixing
Nick Townsend – mastering
Fleshwater – artwork, layout

References

2022 albums
2022 debut albums
Albums produced by Kurt Ballou